Rajapalle  is a village in Warangal district of Telangana State, India. The village is administrated by a sarpanch, an elected representative of the village.

References

External links
 Village & Panchayats at Narayanpet (Telgangana government)

Villages in Warangal district